Arthur Barber (born 23 November 1898, date of death unknown) was an English cricketer. He played in two matches for Essex in 1925.

References

External links

1898 births
Year of death missing
English cricketers
Essex cricketers
People from West Ham